The Hong Kong Sprint is a Group 1 flat horse race in Hong Kong which is open to thoroughbreds aged three years or older. It is run over a distance of 1,200 metres (about 6 furlongs) at Sha Tin, and it is scheduled to take place each year in mid December.

The race was first run in 1999, and it was originally contested over 1,000 metres. It was richest 1,000m horse race in the world before 2006. It was promoted to Group 1 status in 2002, and the present distance, 1,200 metres, was introduced in 2006. The event is now the final leg in the nine race Global Sprint Challenge series, preceded by The Age Classic.

The Hong Kong Sprint is one of the four Hong Kong International Races, and it presently offers a purse of HK$24,000,000.

Records
Speed record: (at present distance of 1,200 metres)
 1:07.80 – Absolute Champion (2006)

Most wins:
 2 – Falvelon (2000, 2001)
 2 – Silent Witness (2003, 2004)
 2 – Sacred Kingdom (2007, 2009)
 2 – Lord Kanaloa (2012, 2013)
 2 – Aerovelocity (2014, 2016)
 2 – Mr Stunning (2017, 2018)

Most wins by a jockey:
 3 – Brett Prebble (2006, 2009, 2011)

Most wins by a trainer:
 3 – Ricky Yiu (1999, 2007, 2009)

Most wins by an owner:
 2 – Dawn Falvey et al. (2000, 2001)
 2 – Archie & Betty da Silva (2003, 2004)
 2 – Sin Kang Yuk (2007, 2009)
 2 – Lord Horse Club (2012, 2013)
 2 – Daniel Yeung Ngai (2014, 2016)
 2 – Maurice Koo Win Chong (2017, 2018)

Winners

See also
 List of Hong Kong horse races

References
Racing Post:
 Racing Information of Cathay Pacific Hong Kong Sprint (2011/12)
 Website of Cathay Pacific Hong Kong Sprint (2011/12)
 The Hong Kong Jockey Club
 horseracingintfed.com – International Federation of Horseracing Authorities – Hong Kong Sprint (2016).
 pedigreequery.com – Hong Kong Sprint – Sha Tin.

Open sprint category horse races
Horse races in Hong Kong
Recurring sporting events established in 1999
1999 establishments in Hong Kong